Östlund, Östlundh and Ostlund are Swedish surnames,  Østlund is its Norwegian form. Notable people with the surname include: 

Agda Östlund
Alexander Östlund, Swedish football player
Angelica Östlund
Anita Östlund
Cecilia Östlund (born 1988), Swedish curler
Christopher Östlund, Swedish magazine publisher
Connie Östlund (born 1960), Swedish curler
David Ostlund, American strongman athlete
Dennis Östlundh
Erik Östlund, Swedish cross country skier
Fanny Östlund
Lori Ostlund, American short story writer 
Madeleine Östlund
Marie-Helene Östlund, Swedish cross-country skier
Noah Östlund (born 2004), Swedish ice hockey player
Peder Østlund, (1872–1939) Norwegian speed skater 
Ruben Östlund, Swedish film director
Thomas Östlund

See also
Ortlund

Swedish-language surnames